Villiers-sur-Marne (literally Villiers sur Marne) is a commune in the eastern suburbs of Paris, France.

The commune of Villiers-sur-Marne is part of the sector of Porte de Paris, one of the four sectors of the "new town" of Marne-la-Vallée.

History
On 7 July 1899, a part of the territory of Villiers-sur-Marne was detached and merged with a part of the territory of La Queue-en-Brie and a part of the territory of Chennevières-sur-Marne to create the commune of Le Plessis-Trévise.

Population

Transport
Villiers-sur-Marne is served by Villiers-sur-Marne–Le Plessis-Trévise station on Paris RER line E.

Education
There are seven preschools and seven elementary schools.
Preschools: J. et M. Dudragne, Théophile Gautier, Edouard Herriot, Jean Jaures, Charles Peguy, Charles Perrault, Jean Renon
Elementary schools: Albert Camus, Léon Dauer, J. et M. Dudragne, Jules Ferry, Edouard Herriot, Jean Jaures, Jean Renon

There are two junior high schools, Collège Pierre et Marie Curie, and Collège Les Prunais.

Twin towns – sister cities

Villiers-sur-Marne is twinned with:
 Entroncamento, Portugal
 Friedberg, Germany

Until November 2011, it was also twinned with Bishop's Stortford in the United Kingdom, when the English town controversially cut its links with Villiers-sur-Marne, as well as Friedberg.

Notable people
Mossi Traoré, fashion designer
Vanessa Paradis, singer
Hayat Boumeddiene, fugitive and suspected accomplice of her common law husband Amedy Coulibaly, the main suspect for the Montrouge shooting  and the hostage-taker and gunman in the Porte de Vincennes siege, in which he killed four hostages.

See also
Communes of the Val-de-Marne department

References

External links

Official website (in French)

Communes of Val-de-Marne
Porte de Paris